Michael Zilmer-Johns, Ambassador, Commander 1st Class of the Order of the Dannebrog is a Danish diplomat.

Michael Zilmer-Johns was born 19 June 1957 and studied economics at Copenhagen University and Christian Albrecht University in Kiel. After graduation in 1982 he began his career at the Danish Ministry of Foreign Affairs working on GATT, EEC accession negotiations with Spain and Portugal as well as development co-operation with Latin America, Angola and Mozambique.

From 1985–88 he served as Secretary of Embassy at the Danish EEC representation in Brussels. Back in Copenhagen he became Secretary of the Corporate Board and Assistant Private Secretary to Minister for Foreign Affairs Uffe Ellemann-Jensen. Between 1992 and 1995 he was Head of the EU and Economic Section at the Danish Embassy in Bonn. After one year as Deputy in the Department for North Africa, the Middle East and Latin America at the Danish Ministry of Foreign Affairs, he became head of the Policy and Planning Department of the Danish International Development Agency in 1996.

10 days before the terror attack on 9/11 2001 he was appointed Political Director and worked intensively during the next two years handling the ensuing crisis i.a. chairing the EU Political Committee during the Danish EU Presidency in 2002. In 2003 he became foreign and security advisor to Prime Minister Anders Fogh Rasmussen with the Iraq War and the EU Constitutional Treaty among key challenges. In 2005 he returned to the Ministry of Foreign Affairs as State Secretary for Foreign and European Affairs. His responsibilities covered the EU, OSCE, Denmark’s strategic partnerships with the US, Russia and China, other bilateral relations as well as security, including NATO and Danish participation in military operations.

In 2013 he was seconded to the European External Action Service as advisor on security and defence. He served as Danish ambassador to NATO 2014-18 and Chief of Protocol in the Danish MFA 2018-21.In March 2020 the Danish Government tasked him to chair a security policy group with a mandate to prepare a “Whitepaper” on Denmark’s international and security situation in order to prepare the next multiannual Danish Defence spending Agreement. The paper - Danish Defence and Security towards 2035 was published in October 2022 https://um.dk/udenrigspolitik/sikkerhedspolitik/den-sikkerhedspolitiske-analysegruppe   

Ambassador Zilmer-Johns is married to Danish PSC-ambassador Lisbet Zilmer-Johns and has 4 children.

External links
 Michael Zilmer-Johns, European Parliament
 Michael Zilmer-Johns, NATO
https://um.dk/udenrigspolitik/sikkerhedspolitik/den-sikkerhedspolitiske-analysegruppe

1957 births
Living people
Permanent Representatives of Denmark to NATO
Commanders of the Order of the Dannebrog